Samadhi is a 1972 Hindi film directed by Prakash Mehra. The film stars Dharmendra in double role as father and son, along with Asha Parekh and Jaya Bhaduri as their love interests. The music was composed by R. D. Burman.  The memorable songs in the film include "Kaanta Laga", "Jab Tak Rahe" and "Jaan-E-Jaana". The film was remade in Telugu as Nindu Manishi (1978). The film became a huge success at the box office, collecting around 3.2 crore rupees.

Cast 
 Dharmendra as Daku Lakhan Singh / Jaswant Singh / Ajay (double role)
 Asha Parekh as Champa Singh
 Jaya Bhaduri as Rekha
 Madan Puri as Jaggu
 Abhi Bhattacharya as Seth Manoharlal
 Dulari as Mrs. Manoharlal
 Leela Mishra as Mausi
 Tun Tun as Kalavati
 Sunder
 Randhir
 Keshav Rana as Jailor
 M. B. Shetty
 Bhushan Tiwari

Soundtrack 
"Kaanta Laga" is the most popular song from the film, and was remixed by T-Series album DJ Doll with an accompanying music video starring Shefali Jariwala.

All lyrics are penned by Majrooh Sultanpuri.

References

External links 

1970s Hindi-language films
Indian action drama films
1970s action drama films
1972 films
Films directed by Prakash Mehra
Films scored by R. D. Burman
Hindi films remade in other languages
1972 drama films